Olivia Tjandramulia (born 11 May 1997) is an Indonesian-born Australian tennis player.

She was born in Jakarta, Indonesia but grew up in Rockhampton, Australia, and made her WTA Tour debut at the 2014 Hobart International, in singles and in doubles, partnering Kimberly Birrell.

Tjandramulia has a career-high WTA singles ranking of 350, achieved on 11 June 2018. On 7 November 2022, she peaked at No. 104 in the doubles rankings.

On the ITF Junior Circuit, Tjandramulia achieved a career-high ranking of 39, on 31 August 2015.

ITF Circuit finals

Singles: 3 (3 runner–ups)

Doubles: 20 (10 titles, 10 runner–ups)

References

External links
 
 
 

1997 births
Living people
Australian female tennis players
Indonesian people of Chinese descent
Sportspeople from Rockhampton
Tennis people from Queensland
Sportspeople from Jakarta
Australian people of Chinese descent
Australian people of Indonesian descent
Indonesian emigrants to Australia